The 1952 Colombo Cup was the first edition of the Colombo Cup held in Colombo, Ceylon. India
and Pakistan were declared as the joint winners.

Points Table

(C) refers to champions

Notes: The competition rules stated that, in the event of a tie on points, goal average would be the tiebreaker. However, the organising committee took the view that goal average could not be considered, since neither India nor Pakistan had conceded any goals, and consequently it was decided that the trophy should be shared. Pakistan won a coin toss to decide which country would receive the trophy for the first six months.

Matches

cancelled due to the death of Ceylon's Prime Minister D. S. Senanayake

References

Colombo Cup
1952 in Ceylon